Ophryophryne synoria is a species of frog in the family Megophryidae. It is only known from its type locality in eastern Cambodia (Keo Seima Wildlife Sanctuary, Mondulkiri Province) and from southern Vietnam (Bình Phước and Đồng Nai Provinces). Common names O'Reang horned frog and O'Reang mountain toad have been proposed for it.

It is present in several protected areas: its type locality, Keo Seima Wildlife Sanctuary in Cambodia, and Bù Gia Mập and Cát Tiên National Parks in Vietnam.

References

synoria
Amphibians of Cambodia
Amphibians of Vietnam
Amphibians described in 2006
Taxa named by Bryan Lynn Stuart
Taxobox binomials not recognized by IUCN